Abbiategrasso, formerly written Abbiate Grasso (local), is a comune and town in the Metropolitan City of Milan, Lombardy, northern Italy, situated in the Po valley approximately  from Milan and  from Pavia.

History 
The town dates from Roman times. Its name indicates that it was part of a territory known as "'the fertile valley": a document of 1304 referring to the Habiate qui dicitur Grasso, a title that gradually transformed into Abbiategrasso.

Abbiategrasso received the honorary title of city with a royal decree of 31 March 1932.

Main sights
The Visconti Castle (Italian: Castello Visconteo), built in 1382 by Gian Galeazzo Visconti above a pre-existing 13th-century fortification. It was enlarged and decorated by Filippo Maria Visconti after 1438. It has a quadrangular plan with angular towers, and the interior has Renaissance frescoes and graffiti. The central court has a portico.
Basilica church of Santa Maria Nuova, built in 1388 to celebrate the birth of Gian Galeazzo Visconti's son. It is preceded by a Renaissance portico and as an unfinished façade (1497), whose pronaos is attributed to Donato Bramante.
Baroque church of San Bernardino (17th century)
15th century Casa Albini

Twin towns 
Abbiategrasso is twinned with the following towns:
 Ellwangen, Germany
 Langres, France

People  
 Christian Abbiati, footballer
 Franco Moschino, fashion designer
 Giuseppina Tuissi, partisan during World War II
 Marco Villa, road and track cyclist

References

External links 

 Official website 

Cities and towns in Lombardy